Kromme Dam (old Churchill Dam), is a multi-arch type dam located at the Kromme River (sometimes spelled Krom River), near Kareedouw, Eastern Cape, in South Africa. It was established in 1943 and its main purpose is for municipal and industrial usage.

Location 
Kromme Dam lies east-southeast of Kareedouw, south of the path of the Langkloof Valley (R62 road), and on the northern slopes of the Kareedouw Mountains. The dam is 100 km west of Gqeberha, at 34° 00' S, 24° 29' E.

Dimension 
The dam has a capacity of 35 million m³, is 43 m high, and has a maximum reservoir area of 2,492 km2 and a 12-m lock. Gravity-based pipelines bring the water to the city.

History 
Port Elizabeth grew rapidly in the 1930s. George Begg, the City Engineer, suggested building a dam on the Krom, the closest river with plentiful and good-quality water. Although construction began in 1936, it would not be finished until after World War II. In 1942, it was decided to name the dam after Sir Winston Churchill in honor of his prominent role in that war. Gen. Jan Smuts dedicated it in 1948.

Spoorbek 
As the dam filled, the waters covered Hendrik Spoorbek's farm (known as Spoorbek's Land).

Floods 
The Churchill Dam and the Impofu Dam help control periodic floods of the Krom River. These have historically damaged fields and building on the banks and near the mouth of the river.

See also
List of reservoirs and dams in South Africa
List of rivers of South Africa

Bibliography 
 Logie, Bartle (1999). Governor's travels. A journey along the Kouga/Tsitsikamma coast. Hunters Retreat: Bluecliff. 
 krommerivier.wordpress.com
 www.dwa.gov.za

References 

 List of South African Dams from the Department of Water Affairs and Forestry (South Africa)

Dams in South Africa
Dams completed in 1943